Justice Clifford refers to Nathan Clifford, associate justice of the United States Supreme Court. Justice Clifford may also refer to:

Robert L. Clifford, associate justice of the New Jersey Supreme Court
Robert W. Clifford, associate justice of the Maine Supreme Judicial Court